Urbauer Fishing Lodge Historic District, also known as the Mozark Club and Windsor Estates Mental Health Facility, is a national historic district located at Fulton, Callaway County, Missouri. It encompasses five contributing buildings, one contributing site, and one contributing structure constructed by St. Louis industrialist Hugo Urbauer as a private fishing retreat. 

It was developed about 1930, and includes the main lodge, a Bungalow style house, a seven-vehicle garage, pumphouse, a set of 83 concrete stairs leading down to the Niangua River, and a small concrete storage building. The main lodge is a one- to two-story building constructed of sandstone, limestone and cinderblock. It as a gable roof with wide overhanging eaves.

It was listed on the National Register of Historic Places in 2006.

References 

Historic districts on the National Register of Historic Places in Missouri
Bungalow architecture in Missouri
Buildings and structures in Camden County, Missouri
National Register of Historic Places in Camden County, Missouri